Clémentine Margaine (born 1984 in Narbonne), is a French operatic mezzo-soprano.

Training and career
Clémentine Margaine studied at the Paris Conservatoire. She then joined the Deutsche Oper, where she sang the leading roles of Carmen, Dalila in Samson et Dalila and Marguerite in Le Damnation de Faust. She has sung the role of Carmen at a number of the world's leading opera houses including the Paris Opera, Opera Australia and the Metropolitan Opera, New York, in 2017, when she won praise for her "vast" range and "subtle art". This was broadcast in the 2018–2019 Met-HD series on 2-Feb-2019.

She appeared as Fidès in a new production of Meyerbeer's Le prophète at the Deutsche Oper in 2017.

Notes

Conservatoire de Paris alumni
1984 births
French operatic mezzo-sopranos
21st-century French women opera singers
Living people
People from Narbonne